This article is about the particular significance of the year 2001 to Wales and its people.

Incumbents
First Minister – Rhodri Morgan
Secretary of State for Wales – Paul Murphy
Archbishop of Wales – Rowan Williams
Archdruid of the National Eisteddfod of Wales – Meirion Evans

Events
1 March – Peter Clarke is appointed Children's Commissioner for Wales.
1 June – Official opening of Cardiff Bay Barrage.
7 June – In the UK general election:
Plaid Cymru retain a total of 4 seats. They lose Ynys Môn to Labour but Adam Price gains Carmarthen East and Dinefwr from Labour's Alan Williams.
Newly elected Labour MPs include Hywel Francis (Aberavon), Mark Tami (Alyn and Deeside), Wayne David (Caerphilly), Ian Lucas (Wrexham) and Chris Bryant (Rhondda)
Kevin Brennan replaces Rhodri Morgan as MP for Cardiff West.
16 June – Entrepreneur Terry Matthews is knighted in the Queen's Birthday Honours list.
11 July – Welsh language pressure group Cymuned is launched at a meeting in Mynytho.
1 August – Coleg Harlech Workers' Educational Association (North Wales) is created through the merger of The Workers' Educational Association (North Wales) and Coleg Harlech.
16 September – To commemorate "Glyndwr Day", actress Siân Phillips unveils a memorial statue to Catrin Glyndŵr in London.
26 October – A memorial service to celebrate the life of Harry Secombe is held at Westminster Abbey and attended by the Prince of Wales (now Charles III).

Arts and literature
15 March - Julien Macdonald is chosen as fashion house Givenchy's new designer.
24 March - Opening of the exhibition Let Paul Robeson Sing! in Cardiff.
15 December - Rob Brydon wins Best TV Comedy Actor award in the British Comedy Awards.
25 December - Matthew Rhys and Tom Ward star in a TV adaptation of The Lost World.
November - John Bourne establishes the Wrexham Stuckists group of artists.
Jessica Garlick makes the last ten in the first series of Pop Idol.
Andrew Vicari sells a collection of 125 paintings of the First Gulf War to Prince Khaled of Saudi Arabia for £17 million.
Irish photographer Paul Seawright is awarded a personal chair by the University of Wales, Newport.

Awards
Prix Hélène Rochas - Rebecca Evans
Cardiff Singer of the World - Marius Brenciu
Glyndŵr Award - John Meirion Morris

National Eisteddfod (held in Denbigh)
National Eisteddfod of Wales: Chair - Mererid Hopwood (first woman ever to win the Chair)
National Eisteddfod of Wales: Crown - Penri Roberts
National Eisteddfod of Wales: Prose Medal - Elfyn Pritchard
Wales Book of the Year:
English language: Stephen Knight - Mr Schnitzel
Welsh language: Owen Martell - Cadw dy ffydd, brawd
Gwobr Goffa Daniel Owen -

New books

English language
Malcolm Pryce - Aberystwyth Mon Amour
Alastair Reynolds - Chasm City
Jon Ronson - Them: Adventures with Extremists
Carole Seymour-Jones - Painted Shadow: The Life of Vivienne Eliot, First Wife of T.S. Eliot

Welsh language
Roger Boore and Rhian Nest James - Hoff Hwiangerddi
Gwynfor Evans - Cymru o Hud
Tudur Dylan Jones - Adenydd
Angharad Tomos - Cnonyn Aflonydd

Music
Feeder - Echo Park (album)
Hilary Tann - The Grey Tide and the Green, commissioned for the Last Night of the Welsh Proms and performed by the Royal Liverpool Philharmonic Orchestra conducted by Owain Arwel Hughes
Catatonia - Paper Scissors Stone (album)
Goldie Lookin' Chain - Don't Blame the Chain (album)
Melys - Chinese Whispers (album)
Terris - "Fabricated Lunacy" (single) and Learning to Let Go (debut album)

Film
John Rhys-Davies makes his first appearance as Gimli in The Lord of the Rings: The Fellowship of the Ring.
Sara Sugarman writes and directs Very Annie Mary, featuring Welsh stars such as Jonathan Pryce, Kenneth Griffith, Matthew Rhys, Ioan Gruffudd, Mary Hopkin and Ruth Madoc.
Rhys Ifans co-stars in The Shipping News.
A Bollywood film, Mein Dil Tujhko Diya (I Gave You my Heart), is shot in Aberystwyth and the Elan Valley.
In Gosford Park, Jeremy Northam plays a fictionalised version of Ivor Novello.  Several of Novello's songs feature in the film's soundtrack.
Nia Roberts stars in A Day Out.

Welsh-language films
Against the Dying of the Light
Y Delyn

Broadcasting

Welsh-language television
Y Stafell Ddirgel (drama serial)

English-language television
The Bench

Sport
BBC Wales Sports Personality of the Year – Joe Calzaghe
Football - Liverpool F.C. win the FA Cup the first time it is played in Cardiff's Millennium Stadium.

Births
23 March - Dream Alliance, racehorse bred near Blackwood

Deaths
11 January - Lorna Sage, critic, 57 (emphysema)
20 January - Crispin Nash-Williams, mathematician, 68
18 February - Claude Davey, Wales international rugby union captain, 92
22 February - Cledwyn Hughes, Lord Cledwyn of Penrhos, former Secretary of State for Wales, 84
11 April - Sir Harry Secombe, singer and comedian, 79
16 April - Henry Morgan Lloyd, clergyman, 89
26 April - Dafydd Rowlands, minister and writer, 69
30 April - Brian Morris, Baron Morris of Castle Morris, poet, critic and politician, 71
25 May - Delme Bryn-Jones, operatic baritone, 67
10 June - Samuel Ifor Enoch, theologian, 86 
17 July - Val Feld, the first member of the Welsh Assembly to die, 53 (cancer)
19 July - Roderic Bowen, MP, 87
August - Valerie Davies, Olympic swimmer, 89
19 September - Rhys Jones, archaeologist, 60
October - John Owen, television writer (suicide)
6 December - Eryl Stephen Thomas, former Bishop of Monmouth and of Llandaff, 91
7 December - Ray Powell, MP, 73

See also
2001 in Northern Ireland

References

 
Wales